Mario Brescia Cafferata (September 25, 1929 – May 16, 2013) was a Peruvian billionaire businessman. He was the co-chairman of Grupo Breca, a conglomerate founded by his father, and the president of BBVA Continental, a Peruvian bank.

Early life
Mario Brescia Cafferata was born on September 25, 1929. His father, Fortunato Brescia Tassano, was an Italian-born real estate investor who founded Grupo Breca. He had a brother, Pedro Brescia Cafferata, and two sisters, Ana Maria Brescia Cafferata  and Rosa Brescia Cafferata.

Career
Brescia Cafferata managed Grupo Breca with his brother, Pedro Brescia Cafferata. He succeeded his brother as the president of BBVA Continental. Brescia Cafferata was the world's 831st richest person, with an estimated wealth of $1.8 billion in 2013. He served as President of the National Club from 2000 to 2002.

Death and legacy
Brescia Cafferata died on May 16, 2013. His estate was inherited by his sons.

References

1929 births
2013 deaths
Peruvian people of Italian descent
Peruvian billionaires
20th-century Peruvian businesspeople
Peruvian bankers
Brescia family